The 1917 Western State Normal Hilltoppers football team represented Western State Normal School (later renamed Western Michigan University) as an independent during the 1917 college football season.  In their 11th season under head coach William H. Spaulding, the Hilltoppers compiled a 4–3 record and outscored their opponents, 203 to 105. Tackle Warren Allen was the team captain.

Schedule

References

Western State Normal
Western Michigan Broncos football seasons
Western State Normal Hilltoppers football